"Adiós Amor" (English: 'Goodbye my Love') is a song written by Salvador Garza for Los Dareyes de la Sierra.

Adiós Amor may also refer to:

Film
Adiós Amor, film by Abel Salazar

Music

Albums
Adiós Amor, a 1982 album by Andy Borg
Adiós amor, a 1992 album by Marisela

Songs
"Adiós Amor" (Sheila song), 1967
"Adiós Amor" (Andy Borg song), 1982
"Adiós Amor (Goodbye My Love)", a 1967 song by José Feliciano
"Adiós Amor", a 1968 song by the Casuals
"Adiós Amor", title track from Marisela's 1992 album
"Adiós Amor", a 1999 song by Mar de Copas

See also
Adiós, amor mío, a telenovela
Goodbye My Love (disambiguation)